Ferdinand Eidman (December 1, 1842 Worms, then in the Grand Duchy of Hesse, now in Rhineland-Palatinate, Germany – May 5, 1910 Manhattan, New York City) was an American politician from New York.

Life
He attended the common schools in Germany, and then emigrated to the United States. He settled in New York City and became a lithographic printer. He fought in the American Civil War. In 1865, he married Mary Germann, and they had several children.

He was a member of the New York State Assembly (New York Co., 10th D.) in 1879; and a member of the New York State Senate (7th D.) in 1880 and 1881.

In 1885, he was elected Coroner of New York City. He was Collector of Internal Revenue for the Third District of New York during the Benjamin Harrison administration; and was again appointed to this office by President William McKinley in 1897.

He died on May 5, 1910, at his home at 51 Seventh Street in Manhattan of diabetes, and was buried at the Lutheran All Faiths Cemetery.

Sources
 Civil List and Constitutional History of the Colony and State of New York compiled by Edgar Albert Werner (1884; pg. 291 and 378)
 The State Government for 1879 by Charles G. Shanks (Weed, Parsons & Co, Albany NY, 1879; pg. 99f)
 FERDINAND EIDMAN DEAD in NYT on May 6, 1910

1842 births
1910 deaths
Republican Party New York (state) state senators
Politicians from New York City
German emigrants to the United States
Republican Party members of the New York State Assembly
Deaths from diabetes
People from Worms, Germany
People from Rhenish Hesse
19th-century American politicians